La Guita Xica  is a dragon that appears amongst the legends of Catalonia beginning in 1890. The dragon had many names, including Guita Boja, La Guita Xica, Mulaguita, La Mulassa, Mula Fera, and Mula Guita. Its name transformed over time, originally started as Mulassa, then Mulaguita, and finally Guita by the twentieth century. The name La Mulassa comes from an older term, mulassas, meaning 'monstrous mules,' which was used in Catalan mythology to refer to mule-dragon hybrids. La Guita Xica was originally considered a demon, but has become a protective spirit over the past century. It is also called a tarasca, which is a name for draconic creatures of Spanish and Latin American folklore.

La Guita Xica was half-mule and half-dragon. This comes from Catalan mountains where the mule remains a richly evocative animal. It had a strong practical importance, but it is also known for its temperament, which was disruptive and uneasy to the point where its domestication was considered untrustworthy. Originally La Guita Xica was considered a threatening force but it is now considered a protective dragon that defends the people of Catalonia and the Eucharist's festivals of Patum de Berga.  During the festivals, large representations of the dragon are built in the town squares, spitting fireworks.

It has a green body similar to that of an equine, and a very long neck and fangs. La Guita Xica's neck has been likened to that of the Loch Ness Monster.

See also
Patum de Berga
Berga
Cuélebre

References

”Giants, Monsters, and Dragons: An Encyclopedia of Folklore, Legend, and Myth” (Paperback)Carol Rose 2001

European dragons
Catalan folklore
Catalan legendary creatures